The 2005 World Snooker Championship (also referred to as the 2005 Embassy World Snooker Championship for the purposes of sponsorship) was a professional snooker tournament that took place at the Crucible Theatre in Sheffield, England. The tournament started on 16 April, and ended on 2 May 2005. The event was the eighth and final world ranking event of the 2004–05 snooker season, following the 2005 China Open. The event was organised by the World Professional Billiards and Snooker Association. Due to laws banning advertising cigarettes in Great Britain, this was the last time the event was sponsored by the cigarette company Embassy. The event had a prize fund of £1,121,800, with the winner receiving £250,000.

Ronnie O'Sullivan was the defending champion, having defeated Graeme Dott in the 2004 World Snooker Championship final. O'Sullivan lost in the quarter-finals 11–13 against Peter Ebdon. Qualifier Shaun Murphy won his first ranking title by defeating Matthew Stevens 18–16 in the final. This was the first time that a qualifier won the championship since Terry Griffiths did so in 1979. Murphy aged 22 years and 265 days  is the second youngest winner of the event after Stephen Hendry in 1990. There was a total of 63 century breaks made during the tournament, the highest being a maximum made by Mark Williams in the first round.

Overview
The World Snooker Championship is an annual cue sport tournament and the official world championship of the game of snooker. Founded in the late 19th century by British Army soldiers stationed in India, the sport was popular in Great Britain. In modern times it has been played worldwide, especially in East and Southeast Asian nations such as China, Hong Kong and Thailand. The event was sponsored by the cigarette company Embassy. This was the last event to be sponsored by Embassy, after cigarette advertising was banned within the United Kingdom. The following season was sponsored by 888.com.

In the 2005 tournament, 32 professional players competed in one-on-one snooker matches played over several , using a single elimination format. The 32 players were selected for the event using the  snooker world rankings and a pre-tournament qualification competition. In 1927, the first world championship was won by Joe Davis. The event's final took place in Camkin's Hall, Birmingham, England. Since 1977, the event has been held at the Crucible Theatre in Sheffield, England. Ronnie O'Sullivan had won the 2004 championship by defeating Scotland's Graeme Dott in the final 18–8. This was the second time O'Sullivan had won the world championship, the first being in 2001. The event was organised by the World Professional Billiards and Snooker Association. The event was broadcast in the United Kingdom on the BBC.

Format
The 2005 World Snooker Championship took place from 16 April to 2 May 2005 in Sheffield, England. The tournament was the last of eight ranking events in the 2004–05 snooker season on the World Snooker Tour. It featured a 32-player main draw that was held at the Crucible Theatre, as well as a 70-player qualifying draw that was played at the Pontin's, Prestatyn Sands, from 6 February to 24 March. This was the 29th consecutive year that the tournament had been staged at the Crucible. The draw for the championships was held after qualifying on 28 March.

The top 16 players in the latest world rankings automatically qualified for the main draw as seeded players. Ronnie O'Sullivan was seeded first overall as the defending champion, and the remaining 15 seeds were allocated based on the latest world rankings. The number of frames required to win a match increased throughout the tournament. The first round consisted of best-of-19-frames matches, with the final match being played over a maximum of 35 frames. All 16 non-seeded spots in the main draw were filled with players from the qualifying rounds. The draw for the qualifying competition consisted of 70 players from the World Snooker Tour. Players were seeded by their world ranking, with 16 players added in rounds 2–5. Players who won round five qualified for the main draw.

Prize fund
There was a total prize fund of £1,121,800, with the winner receiving £250,000. In making a maximum break, Mark Williams earned a bonus of £147,000. The breakdown of prize money for the event is shown below:

Winner: £250,000
Runner-up: £125,000
Semi-finalists: £51,000
Quarter-finalists: £26,000
Last 16: £15,850
Last 32: £12,000
Last 48: £8,000
Last 64: £5,000
Televised stage highest break: £14,000
Televised stage maximum break: £147,000
Total: £1,121,800

Summary

First round

The first round was played 16–21 April as best-of-19-frames matches played over two . Defending champion Ronnie O'Sullivan played Stephen Maguire. O'Sullivan lead the match after the first session, 5–4, but in the second session Maguire won five straight frames to go one frame from victory. Trailing 7–9, O'Sullivan won the next three frames with a break of 68 in the 19th frame to win 10–9. Mark Williams made his first career maximum break of 147 in a ranking tournament during his 10–1 first round win over Robert Milkins. Williams made the break in frame 11 to win the match. It was the sixth maximum break in all at the world championships.

Three players made their debut at the world championship through the qualifiers. The first debutant, Michael Holt, played eighth seed Paul Hunter. Hunter had recently been diagnosed with stomach cancer; the match against Holt being his first since the diagnosis. Hunter led the match at 5–4 after the first session but lost the first three frames of the second session. Later, trailing at 6–9 behind, he made a break of 120 in frame 16 and also won the next to trail 8–9. Holt, however,  won frame 18 to win the match. The second debutant, Neil Robertson, lost to Stephen Hendry. Hendry held a 7–2 lead after the first session, but Robertson won four frames in a row, including a break of 110. Hendry, however, won the match 10–7 but commented his "attitude wasn't great" going into the second session, as he had a five frame lead. The final debutant, Mark Selby, lost to John Higgins. Higgins edged the first session of the match 5–4, but won five of the next six frames to win 10–5, including breaks of 138 and 136.

Sixteenth seed Marco Fu played Ali Carter in the first round, but was defeated 4–10. Stephen Lee defeated Maltese player Tony Drago 10–5 by capitalising on a 6–3 lead after the first session. Quinten Hann won only one frame in the opening session against Peter Ebdon. On the resumption of play, Ebdon won the second frame of the second session to win the match. Hann turned up to the event with a hangover and using a friend's . Chris Small had been struggling with the spinal condition ankylosing spondylitis all season. He played against qualifier Shaun Murphy. Murphy took a 5–4 lead after the first session and won five of the next six to win the match 10–5. After the match, Small commented that he "may not be back" due to the spinal condition. Small retired from professional snooker shortly after the match.

World number six Matthew Stevens held a three frame lead over Andy Hicks after the first session. He increased his lead to 8–3 with a break of 105. Stevens won two additional frames to win the match 10–5. Alan McManus was ahead of Drew Henry 5–4 after the first session, but a 128 by Henry levelled the scores at 5–5. McManus won frame 19 with a break of 63 to win the match 10–9. The previous year's runner up Graeme Dott played world number 17 Ian McCulloch. McCulloch lead 6–3 after the first session before a 111 break put him four frames ahead. McCulloch lead at 8–5, but Dott then won four frames to take the lead. McCulloch managed won the next two frames to win the match. He celebrated his victory wildly, even dancing a jig. Also in the first round, six-time winner Steve Davis defeated Gerard Greene, David Gray defeated by Anthony Hamilton, Jimmy White defeated Fergal O'Brien, and Ken Doherty defeated Barry Pinches.

Second round

The second round was played 21–25 April as best-of-25-frames matches held over three sessions. O'Sullivan led Carter 9–7 after the first two sessions, before winning all four frames of the final session to win 13–7. Despite the win, he stated he was "frustrated with [his] own game". Peter Ebdon trailed by four frames after the first session and lost two of the next three to trail 3–8. However, Ebdon won 10 of the next 11 frames to win the match 13–9. Shaun Murphy led 1998 champion John Higgins 9–7 after two sessions, then won the match 13–8 after a break of 108. During the match, Higgins slammed his  on the ground.

Steve Davis trailed debutant Michael Holt 2–6 and 8–10, but won five frames in a row to win 13–10. Seven-time winner Stephen Hendry took only two of the three available sessions to defeat world number 25 Anthony Hamilton 13–3. Hendry led 6–2 after the first session, then won seven of the eight frames in the second. Matthew Stevens held a 12–4 lead after two sessions against Jimmy White. Stevens won frame 17 in a 30-minute session to win 13–4. Alan McManus and Ken Doherty were tied 8-8 after two sessions. Doherty won the next two frames in session three, before McManus leveled the score at 10–10. Doherty lead again after winning frame 21, but McManus won the next two frames to lead 12–11. Two-time champion Mark Williams led Ian McCulloch 5–3 after the first session. McCulloch won six frames in the next session, including two century breaks, to lead 9–7. At the start of the final session, Williams won four straight frames, then McCulloch equalled the scores at 11–11. McCulloch won frame 23, then Williams made a break of 84 to tie the match at 12–12.

Quarter-finals

The quarter-finals were played on 26 and 27 April as best-of-25-frames matches over three sessions. Defending champion Ronnie O'Sullivan played Peter Ebdon in the first quarter-final. O'Sullivan made two century breaks in the opening session to lead 6–2, then won the first two frames of the second session to lead 8–2. Ebdon won four of the next six frames to trail 6–10 going into the final session. Ebdon's slow, deliberate play in the final session made O'Sullivan lose concentration, leaving Ebdon to win 13–11. At one point during the match, Ebdon took five and a half minutes to make a break of 12, significantly longer than O'Sullivan's maximum break in 1997. During the match, Ebdon took over three minutes on one shot, with O'Sullivan asking an audience member what time it was.

Steve Davis reached his first quarter-final since 1996. He played qualifier Shaun Murphy. Murphy won seven of the first eight frames of the match, then led 12–4 after two sessions. He won the opening frame of the final session to win 13–4. Stephen Hendry lost 11–13 to Matthew Stevens. After two sessions, the match was tied at 9–9, then Hendry won the next two frames before Stevens won four in a row to progress to the semi-finals.

Semi-finals

The semi-finals were played 28–30 April as best-of-33-frames matches over four sessions. The first semi-final was played between Peter Ebdon and Shaun Murphy. Ebdon made two century breaks in the first session to take a 6–2 lead in just 80 minutes, but Murphy levelled the match at 12–12 after three sessions. In the final session, Murphy won all five frames with breaks of 62, 47, 72, 60, and 123 to win the match 17–12. By winning, Murphy was only the fourth qualifier to reach the final.

Ian McCulloch and Matthew Stevens played the second semi-final. Stevens trailed 2–6 after the first session, but he leveled the match at 8–8 after the second session. The match was still tied at the end of the third session. In the final session, Stevens won frame 25 with a break of 50, but McCulloch won the next to tie the match at 13–13. Stevens won the next three frames, making a maximum break attempt in frame 27. McCulloch won the next frame, but Stevens won frame 31 to complete a 17–14 victory.

Final

The final between Shaun Murphy and Matthew Stevens was held 1–2 May 2005. It was played as a best-of-35-frames match over four sessions. Stevens had previously reached the final of the 2000 World Snooker Championship (losing 16–18 to Mark Williams) and won the 2003 UK Championship. Before this event, Murphy had not reached a ranking event final. His best was reaching the semi-finals at the 2004 British Open, before losing 6–0 to John Higgins. Stevens led 10–6 after the second session and 12–11 at the end of the third session. However, Murphy defeated Stevens 18–16.

Murphy had 150–1 odds to win at the start of the tournament and became the first qualifier to win the tournament since Terry Griffiths in 1979. In winning the event he was the second youngest world champion after Stephen Hendry in 1990. Murphy made three century breaks during the final to Stevens' one the highest of which was a 137.

Main draw
Shown below are the results for each round. The numbers in parentheses beside some of the players are their seeding ranks, while players in bold denote match winners.

Qualifying
The qualifying tournament featured 70 participants and was played from 23 February to 24 March 2005. The qualifiers consisted of five rounds, which were played at Pontin's, Prestatyn Sands, Wales. The first four qualifying rounds were played from 23 February to 1 March 2005, while the final round was played 23–24 March 2005. Of the 70 participants, 16 players qualified for the main draw, with players seeded by their world rankings. The 1991 champion John Parrott failed to qualify for the first time in his career, losing to Fergal O'Brien 8–10 in the final qualifying round.

Round 1

 10–8 

 10–9 

 10–6 

 10–6 

 10–5 

 10–9 

Rounds 2–5

Century breaks
There were 63 centuries in the 2005 World Snooker Championship. The highest was a maximum break made by Williams in the 11th frame in his first round win over Robert Milkins.

 147, 133, 102  Mark Williams
 138, 114, 108, 103  Stephen Hendry
 138, 136, 106  John Higgins
 138, 137, 132, 129, 125, 123, 121, 111, 108, 107, 100  Shaun Murphy
 137, 125, 115, 101  Ronnie O'Sullivan
 135  Mark Selby
 129, 124, 121, 106, 105  Matthew Stevens
 128  Drew Henry
 127, 124, 122, 111, 108, 108, 100  Ian McCulloch
 126, 108, 103  Stephen Lee
 124  Chris Small
 120  Graeme Dott
 120, 115  Paul Hunter
 118, 114, 110  Steve Davis
 115, 105  Peter Ebdon
 114, 103  Michael Holt
 110  Neil Robertson
 109, 101  Ken Doherty
 107, 104, 103  Alan McManus
 105  Andy Hicks
 102  Stephen Maguire
 102  Barry Pinches
 101  Anthony Hamilton

References

World Snooker Championships
World Championship
World Snooker Championship
Sports competitions in Sheffield
April 2005 sports events in the United Kingdom
May 2005 sports events in the United Kingdom